Frumet is an unincorporated community in Jefferson County, in the U.S. state of Missouri.

History
A post office called Frumet was established in 1870, and remained in operation until 1911. The community took its name from a lead-mining company which operated near the site.

References

Unincorporated communities in Jefferson County, Missouri
Unincorporated communities in Missouri